Anders Göthberg (9 October 1975 – 30 March 2008) was a Swedish guitarist.

Göthberg played guitar for Broder Daniel and Honey Is Cool. He lived his latter life in Stockholm with his girlfriend, artist Paola Bruna. Göthberg died of suicide by jumping from Västerbron in Stockholm. A memorial to Broder Daniel was raised in August 2014 at the site of the band's last concert in Slottsskogen during the Way Out West Festival in 2008, during which the band reunited one last time in memory of Göthberg.

References

External links
 https://web.archive.org/web/20080622125457/http://www.expressen.se/noje/1.1111495/broder-daniel-i-sorg-efter-gitarristens-dod
 https://web.archive.org/web/20080413033522/http://www.text.nu/nyheter-trender/minnesreportage-om-anders-gothberg-i-broder-daniel.html

1975 births
2008 suicides
Swedish rock guitarists
Suicides by jumping in Sweden
20th-century guitarists